Mount Alto is a mountain in County Kilkenny, Ireland.

Geography 
At 276 metres (906 feet), it is the 981st highest mountain in Ireland. It is situated near Brandon Hill and Coppanagh.

See also
 List of mountains in Ireland

References 

Mountains and hills of County Kilkenny